Jeet Gannguli popularly known as Jeet, is a score composer of Bengali and Hindi movies. Gannguli is a music director in Bollywood, scoring music for films.

Gannguli got his first break when Sanjay Gadhvi was signed on to direct Tere Liye and he, in turn, signed on his friends Jeet Gannguli and Pritam as music composers. In 2002 Yash Raj Films signed Gadhvi up to direct Mere Yaar Ki Shaadi Hai, for which the Gannguli-Pritam duo composed the music.

After the duo parted ways, Jeet started scoring music for Hindi and Bengali films, TV serials and Jingles. Jeet Gannguli has also composed music for a single track sung by well known singer in Hindi, Bengali.

Bollywood discography

Bengali discography

Bengali single song discography

Hindi single song discography

Hindi serial discography

Bengali serial discography
Gannguli worked in these Bengali serials.

Commercial ad discography

References

External links
 Jeet Gannguli discography on IMDb

Discography
Discographies of Indian artists
Discographies of classical composers
Folk music discographies
Jazz discographies
Rock music discographies